Vinca major, with the common names bigleaf periwinkle, large periwinkle, greater periwinkle and blue periwinkle, is a species of flowering plant in the family Apocynaceae, native to the western Mediterranean.

Etymology
The genus name probably derives from the Latin word , meaning bind, as the long creeping vines were used to prepare garlands. The Latin specific epithet major means "larger", in relation to the similar Vinca minor

Description
Vinca major is a trailing vine, spreading along the ground and rooting along the stems to form dense masses of groundcover individually 2–5 m across and scrambling up to 50–70 cm high.

The leaves are opposite, nearly orbicular at the base of the stems and lanceolate at the apex, 3–9 cm long and 2–6 cm broad, glossy dark green with a leathery texture and an entire but distinctly ciliate margin, and a hairy petiole 1–2 cm long.

The  flowers are hermaphrodite, axillary and solitary, violet-purple, 3–5 cm diameter, with a five-lobed corolla. The flowering period extends from early spring to autumn.

Distribution and habitat
This species is found in southern Europe and northern Africa, from Spain and southern France east to the western Balkans, and also in northeastern Turkey and the western Caucasus. These are also found in lower Himalayan ranges in Asia. It grows well in full sun and in deep shade.

Subspecies
There are two subspecies, with geographically separate ranges:
Vinca major subsp. major - leaf petioles finely hairy, hairs short (Southern Europe)
Vinca major subsp. hirsuta (Boiss.) Stearn (syn. V. pubescens d'Urv.) - leaf petioles densely hairy, hairs longer; petals much narrower (Caucasus, northeastern Turkey)

The closely related Vinca minor is similar but smaller, with narrower, hairless leaves.

Cultivation
Vinca major is a commonly grown ornamental plant in temperate gardens for its evergreen foliage, spring flowers, and groundcover or vine use.

Many cultivars are available, with differences in flowers, such as white to dark violet flowers, and different patterns and colors of variegated foliage. The cultivar 'Variegata' has gained the Royal Horticultural Society's Award of Garden Merit.

Gallery

Invasive plant species
Vinca major is an invasive species in temperate parts of the United States, South Africa Australia, and New Zealand.  It is especially a common noxious weed 'smothering' native plants and diversity in riparian area and oak woodland habitats of coastal California. It forms dense strands that envelop other plant life and can prevent saplings and shrubs from growing by blocking out the light. Periwinkle moves from place to place, with unintentional human help, in dumped garden waste or as plant fragments carried along in water.

References

 Pignatti S. - Flora d'Italia – Edagricole – 1982, Vol. II, pag. 348
 Flora Europaea: Vinca major distribution
 Blamey, M., & Grey-Wilson, C. (1989). Flora of Britain and Northern Europe. Hodder & Stoughton.
Huxley, A., ed. (1992). New RHS Dictionary of Gardening 4: 664-665. Macmillan.

External links

 
 
 

major
Flora of Europe
Groundcovers
Vines
Garden plants of Europe
Plants described in 1753
Taxa named by Carl Linnaeus